Gustavo Apis Pascoal de Farias (born 14 June 1999), known as Gustavo Apis, is a Brazilian footballer who plays as a midfielder for Fluminense.

Club career
Born in Nova Iguaçu, Rio de Janeiro, Gustavo Apis joined hometown side Nova Iguaçu FC at the age of seven. He made his senior debut on 6 May 2018, coming on as a late substitute in a 1–4 Série D away loss against Caxias.

Gustavo Apis scored his first senior goal on 27 May 2018, netting the opener in a 2–0 home win over Mirassol. On 25 February 2021, he moved to Fluminense on loan, and was initially assigned to the under-23 squad.

Gustavo Apis made his Flu – and Série A – debut on 10 July 2021, replacing Paulo Henrique Ganso late into a 2–1 away success over Sport Recife. On 3 September, he signed a permanent deal with the club until 2025.

Career statistics

References

1999 births
Living people
People from Nova Iguaçu
Brazilian footballers
Association football midfielders
Campeonato Brasileiro Série A players
Campeonato Brasileiro Série B players
Campeonato Brasileiro Série D players
Nova Iguaçu Futebol Clube players
Fluminense FC players
Clube de Regatas Brasil players
Sportspeople from Rio de Janeiro (state)